"Falls Apart" is a song by American rock band Sugar Ray from their third studio album, 14:59 (1999). Released on November 22, 1999, the song reached number 29 on the US Billboard Hot 100 and number five on the Billboard Hot Modern Rock Tracks chart. Outside the US, the single peaked at number 15 in Canada, number 33 in New Zealand, and number 54 in Australia.

Track listings
UK and Australian CD single
 "Falls Apart" (album version) – 4:15
 "Falls Apart" (edit) – 4:18
 "Falls Apart" (instrumental) – 3:54

Japanese CD single
 "Falls Apart" (edit)
 "Falls Apart" (album version)
 "Someday" (live)
 "Every Morning" (live)

Charts

Release history

References

1999 singles
1999 songs
American power pop songs
Atlantic Records singles
Lava Records singles
Song recordings produced by David Kahne
Sugar Ray songs
Songs written by David Kahne